Baraga is a village in Baraga County in the U.S. state of Michigan. The population was 1,883 at the 2020 census. The village is named after Bishop Frederic Baraga.

The village is located in Baraga Township on the Keweenaw Bay on Lake Superior at the junction of US 41 and M-38. It is entirely within the boundaries of the Keweenaw Bay Indian Reservation. The Baraga ZIP code 49908 also serves areas of northern and northwestern Baraga Township.

History
Baraga began with the establishment of the Holy Name Mission at this site by Rev. Frederic Baraga in 1843.

The post office opened with the name Bristol on June 29, 1869 and changed to Baraga on May 11, 1870.

In 1993, the Baraga Correctional Facility was opened in the town.

Geography

Demographics

2020 census
As of the census of 2020, the population was 1,883. The racial makeup of the village was 37.2% White, 31.4% Black or African American, 22.8% Native American, 0.1% Asian, 0.9% from other races, and 7.5% from two or more races. Ethnically, the population was 1.2% Hispanic or Latino of any race.

2010 census
As of the census of 2010, there were 2,053 people, 527 households, and 310 families residing in the village. The racial makeup of the village was 44.9% White, 29.4% African American, 22.0% Native American, 0.1% Asian, 0.1% from other races, and 3.6% from two or more races. Hispanic or Latino of any race were 1.0% of the population.
There were 527 households, of which 33.0% had children under the age of 18 living with them, 34.0% were married couples living together, 18.4% had a female householder with no husband present, 6.5% had a male householder with no wife present, and 41.2% were non-families. 37.0% of all households were made up of individuals, and 16.3% had someone living alone who was 65 years of age or older. The average household size was 2.26 and the average family size was 2.90.

The median age in the village was 35.7 years. 15.8% of residents were under the age of 18; 10.5% were between the ages of 18 and 24; 40.9% were from 25 to 44; 22.6% were from 45 to 64; and 10% were 65 years of age or older. The gender makeup of the village was 68.8% male and 31.2% female.

2000 census 

As of the census of 2000, there were 1,285 people, 544 households, and 326 families residing in the village. The racial makeup of the village was 68.79% White, 0.16% African American, 23.97% Native American, 0.62% Asian, 0.31% from other races, and 6.15% from two or more races. Hispanic or Latino of any race were 0.86% of the population. 25.5% were of Finnish, 9.9% French, 9.2% German, and 6.3% French-Canadian ancestry according to Census 2000.

There were 544 households, out of which 31.3% had children under the age of 18 living with them, 40.6% were married couples living together, 15.6% had a female householder with no husband present, and 39.9% were non-families. 36.2% of all households were made up of individuals, and 17.1% had someone living alone who was 65 years of age or older.  The average household size was 2.34 and the average family size was 3.03.

In the village, the population was spread out, with 27.2% under the age of 18, 7.8% from 18 to 24, 26.3% from 25 to 44, 22.0% from 45 to 64, and 16.7% who were 65 years of age or older.  The median age was 37 years. For every 100 females, there were 87.6 males.  For every 100 females age 18 and over, there were 81.4 males.

The median income for a household in the village was $26,290, and the median income for a family was $33,906. Males had a median income of $31,838 versus $21,333 for females. The per capita income for the village was $14,795.  About 9.8% of families and 15.6% of the population were below the poverty line, including 14.2% of those under age 18 and 20.1% of those age 65 or over.

Transportation
Indian Trails bus lines operates daily intercity bus service between Hancock and Milwaukee with a stop in Baraga Township, just outside Baraga.

Images

References

Notes

Sources

External links

 Baraga County Historical Museum
 The L'Anse Sentinel
 Ojibwa Tribe
 Copper Country

Villages in Baraga County, Michigan
Villages in Michigan
Populated places established in 1843
Michigan populated places on Lake Superior
1843 establishments in Michigan